Závažná Poruba is a village and municipality in Liptovský Mikuláš District in the Žilina Region of northern Slovakia.

History
In historical records the village was first mentioned in 1263.

The Slovak poet Milan Rufus was born in the village in 1928.

Geography
The municipality lies at an altitude of 634 metres and covers an area of 18.664 km². It has a population of about 1231 people.

Notes

External links
http://www.statistics.sk/mosmis/eng/run.html

Ski areas and resorts in Slovakia
Villages and municipalities in Liptovský Mikuláš District